Gracinha Leporace (born Maria da Graça Leporace; 20 January 1950) is a Brazilian singer who works extensively with her husband Sérgio Mendes and his band.

Leporace was born in Ipanema, Rio de Janeiro. She has a sister, Marianna Leporace, who is a singer and actress in Brazil.

Leporace has featured regularly in much of her husband's group's releases since the 1970s and can be heard as the Portuguese-singing female vocal in the hit "Mas que Nada" (featuring The Black Eyed Peas) from the 2006 album Timeless and in the Baden Powell de Aquino composition "Berimbau/Consolação" from the same album, in which she provides the lead vocal. She has been featured on Sergio Mendes's album Magic, released in 2014. She also appears frequently in concert with Mendes's band as a vocalist.

Along with her work with Mendes, she was a member of the Bossa Nova group Bossa Rio in the early 1970s.

Leporace has two sons with Mendes: Gustavo and Tiago. They currently reside in Los Angeles, California.

Discography
 1968 Gracinha Leporace, Philips

References

External links
 Photo of Gracinha from a 1967 magazine cover
 Photo of Gracinha from the 2008 Cape Town International Jazz Festival
 Last.fm biography of Gracinha Leporace

Bossa nova singers
1949 births
Living people
20th-century Brazilian women singers
20th-century Brazilian singers
21st-century Brazilian women singers
21st-century Brazilian singers
Women in Latin music